Christopher Ryan (born February 13, 1962) is an American author best known for co-authoring the book Sex at Dawn (2010).

Biography
He received a B.A. in English and American literature in 1984, and an M.A. and Ph.D. in psychology from Saybrook University, an accredited hybrid low-residency/online learning program based in San Francisco, twenty years later. His master's thesis examined differences in specific personality measures between working fashion models and the general public. His doctoral dissertation analyzed the prehistoric roots of human sexuality, and was guided by the psychologist Stanley Krippner, a humanistic psychologist, with additional committee members Sabrina Zirkel and Jürgen W. Kremer.

Ryan gave a TED talk titled Are we designed to be sexual omnivores? in February 2013, contributes to Psychology Today and hosts a popular podcast called Tangentially Speaking with Dr. Christopher Ryan.

In 2018-2019, Ryan published Civilized to Death: What Was Lost on the Way to Modernity, also known as, Civilized to Death: The Price of Progress, as well as the ebooks: Tangentially Reading and Tangentially Talking Drugs based on his popular podcast, Tangentially Speaking.

He is married to his sometime collaborator and co-author of Sex at Dawn, Cacilda Jethá.

References

External links 
 ChrisRyanPHD.com, Ryan's official website
 Tangentially Speaking Podcast
 
 Tangentially Speaking on Reddit
 PsychologyToday.com Civilized To Death, Why everything's amazing, but nobody's happy

1962 births
21st-century American writers
American male writers
American podcasters
Living people
Saybrook University alumni